This is a list of the annual meetings of the Society for the Advancement of Scandinavian Study:
 107th Annual Meeting (2017): Minneapolis, MN hosted by St. Olaf College and the University of Minnesota
 106th Annual Meeting (2016): New Orleans, LA hosted by the University of Wisconsin–Madison
 105th Annual Meeting (2015): Columbus, OH hosted by Ohio State University
 104th Annual Meeting (2014): New Haven, CT hosted by Yale University. Held in collaboration with the 24th biennial meeting of the Association for the Advancement of Baltic Studies.(Conference website)
 103rd Annual Meeting (2013): San Francisco, CA hosted by the University of California, Berkeley. (Conference website)
 102nd Annual Meeting (2012): Salt Lake City, UT hosted by Brigham Young University. (Conference website)
 101st Annual Meeting (2011): Chicago, IL hosted by North Park University. (Conference website)
 100th Annual Meeting (2010): Seattle, WA hosted by the University of Washington. Held in collaboration with the 22nd biennial meeting of the Association for the Advancement of Baltic Studies. (Conference website)
 99th Annual Meeting (2009): Madison, WI hosted by the University of Wisconsin–Madison. (Conference website)
 98th Annual Meeting (2008): Fairbanks, AK hosted by the University of Alaska, Fairbanks.
 97th Annual Meeting (2007): Quad Cities, IA-IL hosted by Augustana College.
 96th Annual Meeting (2006): Oxford, MS hosted by the University of Mississippi.
 95th Annual Meeting (2005): Portland, OR hosted by the Portland State University.
 94th Annual Meeting (2004): Redondo Beach hosted by the University of California, Los Angeles and University of California, Berkeley.
 93rd Annual Meeting (2003): Minneapolis/St. Paul, MN hosted by the University of Minnesota.
 92nd Annual Meeting (2002): Salt Lake City, UT hosted by Brigham Young University.
 91st Annual Meeting (2001): Chicago, IL hosted by North Park University.
 90th Annual Meeting (2000): Madison, WI hosted by the University of Wisconsin–Madison.
 89th Annual Meeting (1999): Seattle, WA hosted by the University of Washington.
 88th Annual Meeting (1998): Tempe, AZ hosted by the Arizona State University.
 87th Annual Meeting (1997): Urbana–Champaign, IL hosted by the University of Illinois at Urbana–Champaign.
 86th Annual Meeting (1996): Williamsburg, VA hosted by the College of William and Mary.
 85th Annual Meeting (1995): Pullman, WA hosted by Washington State University.
 84th Annual Meeting (1994): Quad Cities, IA–IL hosted by Augustana College.
 83rd Annual Meeting (1993): Austin, TX hosted by the University of Texas, Austin.
 82nd Annual Meeting (1992): Minneapolis/St. Paul, MN hosted by the University of Minnesota.
 81st Annual Meeting (1991): Amherst, MA hosted by the University of Massachusetts.
 80th Annual Meeting (1990): Madison, WI hosted by the University of Wisconsin-Madison.
 79th Annual Meeting (1989): Salt Lake City, UT hosted by Brigham Young University.
 78th Annual Meeting (1988): Eugene, OR hosted by the University of Oregon.
 77th Annual Meeting (1987): Columbus, OH hosted by the Ohio State University.
 76th Annual Meeting (1986): Decorah, IA hosted by Luther College.
 75th Annual Meeting (1985): Urbana-Champaign, IL hosted by the University of Illinois.
 74th Annual Meeting (1984): Seattle, WA hosted by the University of Washington.
 73rd Annual Meeting (1983): Minneapolis/St. Paul, MN hosted by the University of Minnesota.
 72nd Annual Meeting (1982): Nashville, TN hosted by Vanderbilt University.
 71st Annual Meeting (1981): Albuquerque, NM hosted by the University of New Mexico.
 70th Annual Meeting (1980): Ann Arbor, MI hosted by the University of Michigan.
 69th Annual Meeting (1979): Lawrence, KS hosted by the University of Kansas.
 68th Annual Meeting (1978): Amherst, MA hosted by the University of Massachusetts.
 67th Annual Meeting (1977): Seattle, WA hosted by the University of Washington.
 66th Annual Meeting (1976): Austin, TX hosted by the University of Texas, Austin.
 65th Annual Meeting (1975): Madison, WI hosted by the University of Wisconsin–Madison.
 64th Annual Meeting (1974): Washington, DC hosted by George Washington University.
 63rd Annual Meeting (1973): Minneapolis/St. Paul, MN hosted by the University of Minnesota.
 62nd Annual Meeting (1972): New York, NY hosted by Columbia University.
 61st Annual Meeting (1971): Lexington, KY hosted by the University of Kentucky.
 60th Annual Meeting (1970): Chicago, IL hosted by the University of Chicago.
 59th Annual Meeting (1969): Minneapolis, MN hosted by Augsburg College.
 58th Annual Meeting (1968): Berkeley, CA hosted by the University of California, Berkeley.
 57th Annual Meeting (1967): Bloomington, IN hosted by Indiana University.
 56th Annual Meeting (1966): Madison, WI hosted by the University of Wisconsin–Madison.
 55th Annual Meeting (1965): New York, NY hosted by Columbia University.
 54th Annual Meeting (1964): Los Angeles, CA hosted by the University of California, Los Angeles.
 53rd Annual Meeting (1963): Minneapolis, MN hosted by Augsburg College.
 52nd Annual Meeting (1962): Seattle, WA hosted by the University of Washington.
 51st Annual Meeting (1961): Lincoln, NE hosted by the University of Nebraska.
 50th Annual Meeting (1960): Chicago, IL hosted by the University of Chicago.
 49th Annual Meeting (1959): Rock Island, IL hosted by Augustana College.
 48th Annual Meeting (1958): Berkeley, CA hosted by the University of California, Berkeley.
 47th Annual Meeting (1957): Chicago, IL hosted by North Park University.
 46th Annual Meeting (1956): Lawrence, KS hosted by the University of Kansas.
 45th Annual Meeting (1955): Williamsburg, VA hosted by the College of William and Mary.
 44th Annual Meeting (1954): Rock Island, IL hosted by Augustana College.
 43rd Annual Meeting (1953): Lincoln, NE hosted by the University of Nebraska.
 42nd Annual Meeting (1952): Decorah, IA hosted by Luther College.
 41st Annual Meeting (1951): Chicago, IL hosted by North Park University.
 40th Annual Meeting (1950): Northfield, MN hosted by St. Olaf College.
 39th Annual Meeting (1949): East Orange, NJ hosted by Upsala College.
 38th Annual Meeting (1948): Grand Forks, ND hosted by the University of North Dakota.
 37th Annual Meeting (1947): Chicago, IL hosted by the University of Chicago.
 36th Annual Meeting (1946): Lindsborg, KS hosted by the Bethany College.
 No annual meetings held between 1943 and 1945
 32nd Annual Meeting (1942): Blair, NE hosted by Dana College.
 31st Annual Meeting (1941): Chicago, IL hosted by North Park University.
 30th Annual Meeting (1940): Northfield, MN hosted by St. Olaf College
 29th Annual Meeting (1939): Rock Island, IL hosted by Augustana College.
 28th Annual Meeting (1938): Madison, WI hosted by the University of Wisconsin–Madison.
 27th Annual Meeting (1937): Lincoln, NE hosted by the University of Nebraska.
 26th Annual Meeting (1936): Chicago, IL hosted by the University of Chicago.
 25th Annual Meeting (1935): Decorah, IA hosted by Luther College.
 24th Annual Meeting (1934): Minneapolis, MN hosted by Augsburg College.
 No annual meeting held in 1933
 22nd Annual Meeting (1932): Evanston, IL hosted by Northwestern University.
 21st Annual Meeting (1931): Rock Island, IL hosted by Augustana College.
 20th Annual Meeting (1930): Ann Arbor, MI hosted by the University of Michigan.
 19th Annual Meeting (1929): Northfield, MN hosted by St. Olaf College.
 18th Annual Meeting (1928): Chicago, IL hosted by the University of Chicago
 17th Annual Meeting (1927): Madison, WI hosted by the University of Wisconsin–Madison.
 16th Annual Meeting (1926): Minneapolis, MN hosted by the University of Minnesota.
 15th Annual Meeting (1925): Chicago, IL hosted by the University of Chicago.
 14th Annual Meeting (1924): Urbana, IL hosted by the University of Illinois.
 13th Annual Meeting (1923): Iowa City, IA hosted by the University of Iowa.
 12th Annual Meeting (1922): Chicago, IL hosted by Chicago Svenska Klubben
 11th Annual Meeting (1921): Northfield, MN hosted by St. Olaf College
 10th Annual Meeting (1920): St. Peter, MN hosted by Gustavus Adolphus College
 9th Annual Meeting (1919): Chicago, IL hosted by Chicago Norske Klub
 8th Annual Meeting (1918): Chicago, IL hosted by University of Chicago
 7th Annual Meeting (1917): Minneapolis, MN hosted by University of Minnesota
 6th Annual Meeting (1916): Madison, WI hosted by University of Wisconsin-Madison
 5th Annual Meeting (1915): Evanston, IL hosted by Northwestern University
 4th Annual Meeting (1914): Minneapolis, MN hosted by University of Minnesota
 3rd Annual Meeting (1913): Rock Island, IL hosted by Augustana College
 2nd Annual Meeting (1912): Evanston, IL hosted by Northwestern University
 1st Annual Meeting (1911): Chicago, IL hosted by University of Chicago

References

Meetings
SASS meet